Xu-Jia Wang (born September 1963) is a Chinese-Australian mathematician. He is a professor of mathematics at the Australian National University and a fellow of the Australian Academy of Science.

Biography
Wang was born in Chun'an County, Zhejiang province, China. Wang obtained his B.S. in 1983 and his Ph.D. in 1990 from the Department of Mathematics of Zhejiang University (ZJU) in Hangzhou.

After completing his PhD, Wang served as lecturer and associate professor, at ZJU before departing for ANU In 1995. Wang is a Professor in the Centre for Mathematics and its Applications and Mathematical Sciences Institute of Australian National University.

Wang is well known for his work on differential equations, especially non-linear partial differential equations and their geometrical and transportational applications.

Honors and awards
 Australian Mathematical Society Medal (2002)
 invited speaker, 2002 International Congress of Mathematicians
 Morningside Gold Medal of Mathematics, 2007
 Fellow of the Australian Academy of Science (2009).
 Australian Laureate Fellowship (2013)

Publications (selected) 

 
 (with Aram Karakhanyan) 
 (with Guji Tian) 
 (with Kai-Seng Chou) 
 
 (with Neil Trudinger) 
 (with Neil Trudinger and Xi-Nan Ma) 
 (with Xiaohua Zhu)

References

External links
 Xu-Jia Wang's homepage at ANU
 The Australian Mathematical Society Medal
 浙大数学博士汪徐家当选为澳大利亚科学院院士 (in Chinese)
 The Australian Academy of Science

1963 births
Living people
20th-century Chinese mathematicians
21st-century Chinese mathematicians
Academic staff of the Australian National University
Chinese emigrants to Australia
Fellows of the Australian Academy of Science
Zhejiang University alumni
Academic staff of Zhejiang University
Australian mathematicians
Scientists from Hangzhou
Mathematicians from Zhejiang
Educators from Hangzhou